Cyber City, Kochi, also known as Adani Cyber City, is a proposed Special Economic Zone information technology park in the city of Kochi, Kerala, India. It is promoted by Adani and is located near HMT at Kalamassery. Construction was expected to start on 17 February 2011, and the first phase was scheduled to be within two years. The current status of the project is uncertain as the work never commenced as planned.

According to the rules governing a Special Economic Zone, 70% of the built-up area will be processing area for IT and ITES business, primarily for export. The remaining 30 per cent is categorised as a non-processing zone and will feature shopping malls, convention centres, apartment complexes and other lifestyle needs, developing it into a full-fledged township.

Location & Connectivity

The planned township is on 70 acres of land bought from HMT. It is located 17 km from the city centre and 22 km from the International Airport, among an area where a number of other similar developments are being planned. the distance to NH 47 is 5 km.

The VSNL’s communication gateway is located less than 7 km from the park. This gateway handles around 70% of the country’s data traffic. The proximity to the SAFE and SEA-ME-WE 3 cables dropping zone and direct optical fibre link to the gigabyte router of VSNL, enables the park to offer 100% uptime data connectivity to units. Kochi offers Pacific and Atlantic route of connectivity to the US.

Infrastructure

70% of the built up area of the township will be used for IT and ITES industries. The remaining 30% will be non processing area, used for residential, commercial and entertainment purposes.

See also
 Economy of Kochi
 Smart City
 Infopark, Kochi
 Electronics City, Kochi

References

External links
 Keralait.org

Software technology parks in Kerala
Economy of Kochi